Poljane nad Blagovico is a small settlement in the hills north of Blagovica in the Municipality of Lukovica in the  eastern part of the Upper Carniola region of Slovenia.

Name
The name of the settlement was changed from Poljane to Poljane nad Blagovico in 1955.

References

External links

Poljane nad Blagovico on Geopedia

Populated places in the Municipality of Lukovica